Guinwa Zeineddine is a TV Host and Reporter, former Miss Arab USA, and entrepreneur.

Early life 
Zeineddine's family is of Lebanese origin; she was born in Canada on October 30 and raised in the United Arab Emirates.  At the age of 16, Guinwa moved to the United States with her family consisting of her parents and 3 younger siblings. She graduated from the University of Nevada Las Vegas with a dual degree in biological sciences and communications. in 2015

Career 
Guinwa Zeineddine, recently named the Best Arab Figure for 2016, is acknowledged by many as an influential public figure across the United States and the Middle East. Her work is highlighted by many media outlets and involves women empowerment, reporting on beauty and entertainment, and advocating for various causes through her non-profit and community involvement.

This ambitious Lebanese American converted her passion for women and youth empowerment, media, and public speaking into a 501c3 non-profit organization that is currently operating in the state of Nevada. Through her non-profit, Hawiyati (my identity), Guinwa aims to provide disenfranchised women and youth with educational resources and empowerment workshops. She was successful at establishing and implementing various programs that granted her support from various celebrities such as Adel Imam, Ragheb Alameh, Hicham Abbass, Farrah Youssef, Anwar El Amir, the Lebanese Ministry of Tourism and many others.

In 2014, Guinwa was crowned Miss Arab USA with elegance and grace. A pageant that is held annually with a mission to project a positive image of Arabs worldwide. Her work as the reigning queen inspired many others to view Guinwa as a role model and a great example of an Arab American. Till this day, her work is still highlighted in the media.

Miss Arab USA was not the only pageant that Guinwa was able to win. She has been competing in pageants since the age of 16 and succeed at winning multiple awards from various pageants such as Miss Nevada USA, National American Miss, Miss Silver Rose, Miss Black and Rose, etc.

References 

 Al Arabiya News, Guinwa Zeineddine, Miss Arab USA 2014. En.alarabiya.net (2014-09-18). Retrieved on 2016-07-19.
 Miss Arab Usa, Miss Arab 2014, Guinwa Zeineddine missarab.org(2016). Retrieved on 2016-07-19.
 Guinwa Zeineddine, Biography Retrieved on 2016-07-19.
 Hawiyati.  Retrieved on 2016-07-19.
 Blog. Retrieved on 2017-10-09.

Living people
Year of birth missing (living people)
American beauty pageant winners